Haralds Šlēgelmilhs, known internationally as Harald Schlegelmilch (born December 6, 1987) is a Latvian racing driver.

Career
He started racing at the age of 8. He raced in karting championships for seven years. In 2003, Harald participated in Formula BMW testing and in 2004 he drove in the Austrian-Swiss Formula BMW championship. Simultaneously, he was a driver in Formula Renault 2000 Scandinavia. The results were high, as the young driver became the Austrian-Swiss champion and was the best Rookie of F-Renault 2000. He continued with German Formula BMW in 2005. Schlegelmilch was good enough to promote in German Formula Three, scoring a few wins. His team, HS Technik decided to go to Formula Three Euroseries taking Harald with them. They started testing very late, so results of the first races were poor. But as time wore on, Harald was showing better and better pace each race, until he won a race.

In October 2007, he tested a Trident GP2 car. It was announced at December 2 that he will drive in International Formula Master with Trident in 2008. He has been linked to possible GP2 or World Series by Renault drives in 2009, and drove for Comtec Racing in place of Alexandre Marsoin at the opening rounds in Montmeló. Marsoin returned for round two however, leaving Schlegelmilch without a drive. He also drove in the GP2 Asia Series in 2008.

Racing record

Career summary

† - As Schlegelmilch was a guest driver, he was ineligible to score points.

Complete GP2 Series results

Complete GP2 Asia Series results
(key) (Races in bold indicate pole position) (Races in italics indicate fastest lap)

References

External links
 
 

1987 births
Living people
Sportspeople from Riga
Latvian racing drivers
Formula Lista Junior drivers
Nordic Formula Renault 2.0 drivers
Austrian Formula Three Championship drivers
Formula 3 Euro Series drivers
Atlantic Championship drivers
International Formula Master drivers
Formula BMW ADAC drivers
GP2 Asia Series drivers
World Series Formula V8 3.5 drivers
FIA Formula Two Championship drivers
ADAC GT Masters drivers
Cram Competition drivers
Comtec Racing drivers
Conquest Racing drivers
Trident Racing drivers
Lamborghini Super Trofeo drivers
Porsche Carrera Cup Germany drivers